"Young Country" is a song written and recorded by American musician Hank Williams Jr.  It features guest vocals from Butch Baker, Steve Earle, Highway 101, Dana McVicker, Marty Stuart, Keith Whitley, T. Graham Brown. It was released in February 1988 as the third and final single from his album Born to Boogie.  It peaked at number 2 in the United States and in Canada.

Charts

Weekly charts

Year-end charts

References

Hank Williams Jr. songs
1988 singles
Songs written by Hank Williams Jr.
Song recordings produced by Barry Beckett
Warner Records singles
Curb Records singles
Song recordings produced by Jim Ed Norman
1987 songs